The women's 800 metre freestyle event at the 2002 Commonwealth Games as part of the swimming programme took place on 1 and 2 August at the Manchester Aquatics Centre in Manchester, England.

Records
Prior to this competition, the existing world and games records were as follows.

Schedule
The schedule was as follows:

All times are local time

Results

Heats

Final

Final

References

Women's 800 metre freestyle
Commonwealth Games
Common